"She's All I Got" is a song written by Gary U.S. Bonds and Jerry Williams Jr. It has been recorded by several artists. The first version, released in 1971 by Freddie North, was a Top 40 U.S. pop hit, and a version by Johnny Paycheck was a number 2 U.S. country hit that same year. A second country music version was released on Conway Twitty's 1972 Decca LP I Can't See Me Without You.  There was also a version titled "He's All I Got" that was on Tanya Tucker's 1972 album Delta Dawn.  Yet another cover titled "Don't Take Her She's All I've Got" was released by Tracy Byrd, whose version reached number 4 on the U.S. and Canadian country singles charts. Co-author Jerry Williams Jr., aka Swamp Dogg, released his own version on his 2020 album Sorry You Couldn’t Make It.

Content
In the song, the male narrator pleads to someone else not to take away his lover.

Freddie North version
Freddie North was the first artist to record the song, doing so on his album Friend. The only single from this album, it peaked at number 39 on the Billboard Hot 100 and number 10 on the Soul Singles chart in the US. It was the only chart single of North's career.

Chart positions

Johnny Paycheck version

Johnny Paycheck's version was released in October 1971 from his album of the same name. The song spent nineteen weeks on the Billboard Hot Country Singles Chart, reaching a peak of number 2. It was also a number 91 single on the Billboard Hot 100, his only entry there.

Chart positions

Tracy Byrd version

Tracy Byrd's version, retitled "Don't Take Her She's All I Got", is the second single released from his 1996 album Big Love. It peaked at number 4 on both the U.S. and Canadian country singles charts in 1997. It was Byrd's second charting cover of a Paycheck hit, after "Someone To Give My Love To" in 1993.

Critical reception
The single received a positive review in Billboard which praised Byrd's vocal similarities to Paycheck, and said that "Longtime fans will love hearing it again, and younger listeners will welcome Byrd's introducing them to this country classic."

Chart positions

Year-end charts

References

1971 singles
1971 songs
1997 singles
Freddie North songs
Johnny Paycheck songs
Tanya Tucker songs
Tracy Byrd songs
Song recordings produced by Billy Sherrill
Song recordings produced by Tony Brown (record producer)
Epic Records singles
MCA Nashville Records singles